Robert Massi (born 2 January 1987) is an Assyrian-Swedish footballer who plays for AFC United as a midfielder.

References

External links

1987 births
Living people
Swedish people of Assyrian/Syriac descent
Association football midfielders
IF Brommapojkarna players
Syrianska FC players
Allsvenskan players
Superettan players
Swedish footballers
Place of birth missing (living people)
AFC Eskilstuna players
Assyrian footballers